Chapayevo is a rural locality (a selo) in Karalatsky Selsoviet, Kamyzyaksky District, Astrakhan Oblast, Russia. The population was 450 as of 2010. There are 11 streets.

Geography 
Chapayevo is located 25 km southeast of Kamyzyak (the district's administrative centre) by road. Revin-Khutor is the nearest rural locality.

References 

Rural localities in Kamyzyaksky District